Bowning railway station is a heritage-listed closed railway station located on the Main Southern railway in Bowning, Yass Valley Shire, New South Wales, Australia. The railway station was added to the New South Wales State Heritage Register on 2 April 1999.

History 

The station opened in 1876 and closed to passenger services in the 1990s.

Description 

The large two-storey station building is located on the down platform, and was built in 1875. The skillion roof timber signal box dates from circa 1913, as does the type 6, timber J2 residence. The residence was sold on 2 February 1998 and is now privately owned and not included within the heritage listing; the station building itself is now also used as a residence. A timber shed is also included within the station site.

The platforms consist of two brick island platforms. The intact platform lighting forms part of the heritage listing. A 1913 steel and timber footbridge was removed .

Heritage listing 
This is a substantial early station building from 1876 representing the enthusiasm and confidence of early station building design. It is typical of a number of buildings constructed on the southern line. The station complex also exhibits the changes that have taken place with duplication in 1913 and the addition of a platform at the rear of the building so that it became an island platform. The other buildings on the site allow the change in operation to be clearly seen. The station building is one of the few surviving combined station / residences and is of high significance in illustrating the development of the State railway system.

Bowning railway station was listed on the New South Wales State Heritage Register on 2 April 1999 having satisfied the following criteria.

The place possesses uncommon, rare or endangered aspects of the cultural or natural history of New South Wales.

This item is assessed as historically rare. This item is assessed as scientifically rare. This item is assessed as arch. rare. This item is assessed as socially rare.

See also

References

Attribution 

Disused regional railway stations in New South Wales
Articles incorporating text from the New South Wales State Heritage Register
Railway stations in Australia opened in 1876
New South Wales State Heritage Register
Main Southern railway line, New South Wales